The Gare de Mulhouse-Ville, also known as Gare Centrale, is the main railway station in the city of Mulhouse, Haut-Rhin, France. It is the eastern terminus of the Paris-Est–Mulhouse-Ville railway.

Station infrastructure 
The station is a major thoroughfare on the SNCF network as it is the second busiest in the Alsace region after Strasbourg-Ville.

Services 
Mulhouse-Ville station is connected to the LGV Rhin-Rhône high speed line, offering TGV services towards Besançon, Dijon, Paris and southern France. Regional and local services are offered by TER Grand Est. Destinations include:

 Basel
 Belfort
 Colmar
 Frankfurt
 Kruth
 Luxembourg
 Lyon
 Marseille
 Paris Lyon
 Strasbourg
 Zurich

Intermodality 
A tram stop on the forecourt of the station serves as the terminus of lines 2 and 3 of the Mulhouse tramway, as well as the tram-train service to Thann. The outer section of this tram-train line shares its tracks with the SNCF service from inside the station to Kruth.

References

External links

Railway stations in Haut-Rhin
Buildings and structures in Mulhouse
Railway stations in France opened in 1839
Buildings and structures completed in 1932
20th-century architecture in France